Sir John Holman, 1st Baronet (c. 1633 – 1700) was an English  politician who sat in the House of Commons at various times between 1661 and 1685.

Holman was the son of Philip Holman of Warkworth, Northamptonshire and scrivener of London, and his wife Mary Barta of London. In 1661, he was elected Member of Parliament for Banbury in the Cavalier Parliament. He was knighted after April 1661 and was created baronet on 1 June 1663. In 1679 he was re-elected MP for Banbury for the First Exclusion Parliament and for the Second Exclusion Parliament. He was last elected MP for Banbury in 1681. 
 
Holman died at the age of about 66 in or before May 1700.

Holman married Jane Fortrey daughter of Jacob de la Forterie (or Fortrey) merchant of London. They had no children and the baronetcy became extinct on his death.

References

1633 births
1700 deaths
Baronets in the Baronetage of England
English MPs 1661–1679
English MPs 1679
English MPs 1680–1681
English MPs 1681